Max Rudolf may refer to:

Max Rudolf (conductor) (1902–1995), German conductor
Max Rudolf (rower) (born 1891), Swiss rower